Jadot is a French or Belgian surname. It may refer to:

People

 Jean Jadot (1909–2009), Belgian prelate of the Roman Catholic Church
 Jean Jadot (banker) (1862–1932), Belgian railway engineer and banker 
 Jean Jadot (footballer) (1928–2007), Belgian football player
 Lambert Jadot (1875–1967), Belgian railway engineer and executive
 Maxime Jadot (born 1957), Belgian banker 
 Odon Jadot (1884–1968), Belgian railway engineer and administrator
 Yannick Jadot (born 1967), French environmentalist and politician

Other

 Maison Louis Jadot, a French winery